CineMan Productions is an Indian film production and distribution company established by Abhishek Jain, Mikhil Musale, and Anish Shah. It was founded in 2010.

History
Abhishek Jain, Mikhil Musale and Anish Shah met during an international film festival in Ahmedabad and founded CineMan productions in 2010, however Shah later left the company. The first film produced by the company was Jain's directorial debut, Kevi Rite Jaish. The production subsequently produced 2014 film Bey Yaar. The productions also has produced advertisements for various brands such as Cinepolis among others.

Collaboration with Phantom films
Abhishek Jain had approached Anurag Kashyap to produce Kevi Rite Jaish; although Kashyap was impressed with the script, the collaboration did not work out for the film. Later in February 2016, Abhishek Jain announced that CineMan will co-produce three Gujarati films with Anurag Kashyap's Phantom Films, out of which one will be directed by Abhishek himself. The first film to release under joint banner of CineMan productions and Phantom films was Wrong Side Raju, directed by Mikhil Musale.

Streaming platform 
CineMan Productions and Khushi Advertising launched Gujarati language streaming platform OHO Gujarati in May 2021. The first original show to release on the platform was Vitthal Teedi, a drama series starring Pratik Gandhi and directed by Jain.

Filmography

Films

TV series

References

External links
 Official website

Film production companies of Gujarat
Companies based in Ahmedabad
Indian companies established in 2010
2010 establishments in Gujarat